Stengel is a surname. Notable people with the surname include:

 Alfred Stengel (1868–1939), American surgeon
 Casey Stengel (1890–1975), American Major League Baseball player and manager
 Christian Stengel (1903–1986), French film director
 Erwin Stengel (1902–1973), Austrian-British neurologist, psychiatrist, and psychoanalyst
 Henri Christian Michel de Stengel (1744–1796), General in the French Revolutionary Wars
 Hermann von Stengel (1837–1919), Bavarian administrator, German politician and Finance Minister
  Isaiah Stengel, birth name of Isaiah Shachar, Israeli historian
 Kilien Stengel (born 1972), French gastronomic author, and a teacher of gastronomy
 Lawrence F. Stengel (born 1952), United States federal judge
 Richard Stengel, American editor
 Werner Stengel (born 1936), German roller coaster designer and engineer

See also 
 Casey Stengel (Sherbell) a public sculpture by American artist, Rhoda Sherbell
 Stangl
 Stengl
 Tsengel (disambiguation)

German-language surnames
Surnames from nicknames